"Absent Friends" is the sixth episode of the fourth series of the British comedy series Dad's Army. It was originally transmitted on 30 October 1970.

Synopsis
Taking advantage of Captain Mainwaring's absence, the platoon take part in a pub darts match against the ARP wardens.

Plot
Wilson is singing to himself in Mainwaring's office. Suddenly, Mainwaring enters, which is a shock to Wilson, as Mainwaring had gone to a Lodge meeting in London for the weekend. Wilson asks if it was cancelled, but Mainwaring admits he did not go after all as his wife, Elizabeth, does not like being in the house on her own during the air raids. He offers to inspect the men, but Wilson is a bit cagey.

Pike enters in civilian clothing. He admits that his mother put his uniform in the wash tub. Mainwaring is annoyed but agrees to let it pass. He tells Wilson to ask Jones to call the roll, which he does. However, most of them are not there, and only Jones and Pike are on parade. Mainwaring is unimpressed and asks Wilson where his men are. Wilson admits they are all in the pub, playing darts against Hodges' wardens. Mainwaring agrees to turn a blind eye, as long as Wilson brings the men back straight away.

Meanwhile, at the match, things are not going well for the Home Guard. The wardens are clearly winning. Suddenly, Mrs Pike enters and Hodges offers her a drink. While he is at the bar, Wilson arrives and tries to persuade the men to return. He then spots Mrs Pike and wonders what she is doing there. He is accidentally bumped by Hodges, who quickly makes his excuses and scurries off. Wilson leaves in a daze.

Mainwaring receives a phone call from Elizabeth, asking him to get her some off-ration oxtail for him. He tries to explain that it is against his principles, but Elizabeth refuses to listen. Mainwaring calls Jones into the office to ask him about the oxtail, and his wife's craving for it, but crossed wires result in Jones believing he will help to deliver Elizabeth's child.

Mainwaring is annoyed when Wilson returns saying he thinks he has brought the men back, but this is not true. He and Jones will go with Wilson back to the pub and if they fail to bring the men back, Wilson can consider himself under open arrest.

At the match, things are going from bad to worse for the platoon. Things are made worse when Mainwaring, Wilson and Jones enter. Mainwaring tries to persuade the men to return to the hall, with little success. Wilson also tries to persuade Mrs Pike to leave, but to no avail. Mainwaring leaves, very hurt and ashamed of his men. As they leave, Godfrey confides in Walker and Frazer that he does not think they have done the right thing, and leaves. Walker seems on the point of returning too, but Hodges persuades him to play darts.

Back at the church hall, Mainwaring confides in Wilson that the parade is the highlight of his day. While drinking tea, he can feel excitement mounting inside him, but not anymore. Wilson is distracted by Mrs Pike's interest in Hodges and does not listen. They receive a phone call from the police, informing that an Irish Republican Army suspect has been spotted in Ivy Crescent.

They meet the lone police constable outside the house of the suspect and prepare to grab him. However, the man they grab claims to be the suspect's twin brother. Mainwaring is not convinced and marches him back to the church hall.

The ARP Wardens win the darts match, and Walker is reluctant to stay any longer. He would prefer to go back to the church hall, because he did not like the look on Mainwaring's face when he left. Hodges decides to come too, taking Mrs Pike with him.

Not long after the small group return with the suspect, Godfrey returns to the hall, unbeknownst to the men, and falls asleep. Suddenly, a rough man grabs Godfrey by the collar, and asks him where Mainwaring's suspect has been taken. Godfrey bluffs the three men into believing that he and Mainwaring are in the dressing room.

Godfrey informs Mainwaring of the predicament, and Mainwaring orders Pike to fetch the rest of the men. Godfrey informs Mainwaring that he has locked all the doors. The verger enters with an empty bottle, evidently panicking. In the heat of the moment, he ends up knocking out the suspect with the glass bottle.

The rest of the platoon return, and rush to attack the Irishmen, but with little success. Pike enters with a bleeding lip, and Mrs Pike persuades Wilson to "sort them out". The door closes, and Mainwaring and Jones think that Wilson has received a good beating. They are, therefore, shocked when Wilson enters without a scratch on him. Hodges is terrified and leaves.

Sometime later, Mainwaring forgives the men for their lapse in behaviour, and confirms to the platoon that Jones was wrong about Mrs Mainwaring. They "have never been blessed in that way but in every other way it has been a most happy marriage, in fact, almost blissful".

Cast

Arthur Lowe as Captain Mainwaring
John Le Mesurier as Sergeant Wilson
Clive Dunn as Lance Corporal Jones
John Laurie as Private Frazer
James Beck as Private Walker
Arnold Ridley as Private Godfrey
Ian Lavender as Private Pike
Bill Pertwee as ARP Warden Hodges
Janet Davies as Mrs Pike
Edward Sinclair as Verger
J. G. Devlin as Regan
Arthur English as Policeman
Patrick Connor as Seamus
Verne Morgan as Landlord
Michael Lomax as 2nd ARP Warden

Notes
The appearance of Patrick Regan, a suspected IRA man, and colleagues was one of the few occasions in Dad's Army when the platoon was presented with a threat other than the Germans.
In comparison to more frequent re-runs of other episodes in the series, after an initial repeat in 1971, the episode was not screened again until November 1992, and then not again until May 2012. It has been speculated that the presence of the IRA suspect is the reason for this. In the subsequent radio adaptation in April 1976, the IRA suspect is replaced with an escaped convict.

References

Further reading

External links

    

Dad's Army (series 4) episodes
1970 British television episodes